Jacques Lisfranc de St. Martin (12 April 1787 in Saint-Paul-en-Jarez – 13 May 1847) was a pioneering French surgeon and gynecologist. He pioneered a number of operations including removal of the rectum, lithotomy in women, and amputation of the cervix uteri.

He studied medicine in Lyon and Paris, where he worked as an assistant to Guillaume Dupuytren. In 1826 he became director of his own department at the Hôpital de la Pitié, from where he gave classes in clinical medicine. The Lisfranc joint and the Lisfranc fracture are named after him.

Jacques Lisfranc is buried in the Cimetière du Montparnasse in Paris.

Selected works 
 Des diverses méthodes et des différens procédés pour l'oblitération des artères dans le traitement des anévrysmes etc. (Concours-thesis for the chair of Alexis de Boyer), 1834.
 Maladies de l'utérus, d'après les leçons cliniques. Paris 1836. (A book on diseases of the uterus that was prepared by his assistant, Jean Hippolyte Pauly. It includes many case histories from the Hôpital de la Pitié). English translation by G. H. Lodge, Boston, 1839.
 Clinique chirurgicale de l’hôpital de la Pitié. 3 volumes, 1841–1843.

External links and references 
 Biography

1790 births
1847 deaths
French surgeons
French gynaecologists
People from Loire (department)
Burials at Montparnasse Cemetery